Frederick Tyrone Edmond Power Sr. (2 May 1869 – 23 December 1931) was an English-born American stage and screen actor, known professionally as Tyrone Power. He is now usually referred to as Tyrone Power Sr. to differentiate him from his son, actor Tyrone Power.

Early life
Power was born in London in 1869, the son of Harold Littledale Power and Ethel Lavenu. Harold had worked as a singer and actor before his marriage, most notably in Edmund Yates' production Invitations at the Egyptian Hall, London, 1862–63. Turning to business, he became a wine merchant, later collaborating in the mining business with his brother Frederick Power. Harold was the youngest son of the Irish actor Tyrone Power, from whom his son, grandson and great grandson would later take their stage names. Harold's wife Ethel was an actress and the third daughter of conductor and composer Lewis Henry Lavenu.

Frederick Power, as he was then known, was educated at Hampton School then Dover College with his brother George, who would later accompany him on tour in America as Littledale Power. In 1883 at the age of 14 he was sent from Britain to Florida by his parents to learn citrus planting.

Career

Stage
After a couple of years Power ran away from his farm work and joined a theatre stock company at St. Augustine, Florida, debuting as Gibson in Charles Hawtrey's The Private Secretary on 29 November 1886, aged 17. Power steadily moved up the ranks in a variety of roles mainly Shakespearean parts. In 1899, he was in the cast of Mrs. Fiske's Becky Sharp which costarred Maurice Barrymore. 1902 saw Power join Mrs. Fiske again in Mary of Magdala. The following year Power starred opposite Edgar Selwyn in Ulysses. (Selwyn would later join part of his name with Samuel Goldfish's name to create Goldwyn Studios.) Power also had roles in Julia Marlowe's When Knighthood Was in Flower in a 1904 revival.

In August 1905, Power appeared at the Elitch Theatre in Denver with his wife, Edith Crane, in Tess of the D'Urbervilles. According to Mary Elitch Long in her autobiography Lady of the Gardens, "I shall never forget the beauty of his voice nor his first utterance as he entered the Gardens: 'I am about to realize a great ambition, and that is to play in the Elitch Gardens Theatre.'"

In 1908, Power had what was probably his greatest personal theatrical success, The Servant in the House. The production ran for 80 performances in the first half of 1908 and then a return engagement for 48 performances near the close of the year. Following this success, Power appeared in a few more original stage productions like Chu Chin Chow (American version) and The Wandering Jew. The rest of his theatrical career before World War I and after consisted of revivals of popular and Shakesperean plays such as The Merchant of Venice, Julius Caesar, the all-star play Diplomacy, and The Rivals. In 1922, he played Claudius in John Barrymore's groundbreaking production of Hamlet.

Films
After an extremely prosperous 30 years of acting on the stage and touring around the world, Power moved into silent films in 1914. Initially playing the leading man in films, he soon switched to playing villains and proved highly successful. In 1916, Power played the male lead in Where Are My Children?, a serious film about birth control and social issues directed by pioneer director Lois Weber and her husband Phillips Smalley. A pristine copy of this film is preserved in the Library of Congress. That same year Power appeared in a Selig film called John Needham's Double. When not acting on Broadway, Power appeared in films. Producer William Fox found him a great character part at Fox Studios in Footfalls (1921).

Also in 1921 Power appeared in D.W. Griffith's Dream Street in which experimental synchronised sound was used, using the Photokinema sound-on-disc system. In 1924, Power was in the cast of the sumptuous Janice Meredith, a Hearst-produced vehicle for Marion Davies. In 1925, Power appeared in a film called The Red Kimono, a film as daring as Where Are My Children? had been a decade earlier. The Red Kimono was produced and partly written by Dorothy Davenport, the widow of Wallace Reid. It is the only silent Power film available on home video or DVD.

Power finished out the decade and silent era in several A-list silent films. In 1930, Power had a great role as the villainous "bull whacker" Red Flack in Raoul Walsh's widescreen epic The Big Trail, which was shot on location across the American West and was Power's first (and only) talkie, and provided an unknown John Wayne with his first starring role. Power then prepared to film a sound remake of The Miracle Man, which had been a great silent success in 1919 for Lon Chaney.

Death
While filming The Miracle Man, Power died of a heart attack on 23 December 1931 in the arms of his 17-year-old son at his apartment at the Hollywood Athletic Club. He was 62. As Power had filmed only a few scenes before his death, his role was filled by fellow veteran actor Hobart Bosworth.

Stage appearances

Filmography

References

External links

 
 
Tyrone Power Sr at the NY Public Library

1869 births
1931 deaths
19th-century English male actors
20th-century English male actors
Male actors from London
English male film actors
English male silent film actors
English male stage actors
British expatriate male actors in the United States
People educated at Dover College
English people of Irish descent
People educated at Hampton School
Male actors from Kent
English expatriates in the United States
Filmed deaths of entertainers
Power family